Nino Raspudić (born 3 November 1975) is a Croatian conservative philosopher, writer, political analyst and member of the Croatian Parliament. He is a professor at the Faculty of Humanities and Social Sciences in Zagreb and the Faculty of Humanities in Mostar. He is a columnist for the Večernji list and Nezavisne novine, and is one of the editors of the Reflex, a political show on OBN Televizija.

Biography 

Nino Raspudić was born into a Herzegovinian Croat family in Mostar, Bosnia and Herzegovina, Yugoslavia. He finished elementary school in his birth town, and graduated from high school in Treviso, Italy. He graduated philosophy and Italian studies at the Faculty of Humanities and Social Sciences in Zagreb in 1999. He became a Junior Researcher at the Department of Italian Literature of the Faculty of Humanities and Social Sciences in Zagreb in 2000. In 2004 he gained master's degree with thesis Slaba misao - jaki pisci: postmoderna i talijanska književnost (Weak Thought - Strong Writers: a Postmodernist Poetics in the Modern Italian Prose). In 2008 he defended doctoral thesis Jadranski (polu)orijentalizam: prikazi Hrvata u talijanskoj književnosti (Trans-Adriatic Semi-Orientalism: Dominant Models in Constituting a Picture of Croats in Italian Literature from Enlightenment until Today).

Raspudić was one of the founders of the civic organisation Urban Movement in Mostar together with Veselin Gatalo. Gatalo and Raspudić erected a life-size statue of Bruce Lee in Park Zrinjski in November 2005. The statue symbolised unity of Mostar in a city otherwise divided between Croats and Bosniaks.

Raspudić translated a number of works of various Italian writers, including Umberto Eco, Niccolò Ammaniti, Gianni Vattimo and Luigi Pareyson. He also published number of literary critics and essays.

Works

References 

Notes

Books

 

Web sites

External links

1975 births
Living people
Croats of Bosnia and Herzegovina
Writers from Mostar
Croatian columnists
Croatian philosophers
Croatian translators
Representatives in the modern Croatian Parliament
Bosnia and Herzegovina translators
Italian–Croatian translators